Barberey-Saint-Sulpice is a commune in the Aube department in the Grand Est region of north-central France.

The inhabitants of the commune are known as Barberotins or Barberotines.

Geography
Barberey-Saint-Sulpice is located to the immediate north-west of Troyes with the Troyes - Barberey Airport located in the commune. Access to the commune is by the D619 highway which starts at the end of the D319 highway at the edge of Troyes and continues north-west through the commune to Fontaine-les-Grès. The D20 also passes through the commune from Troyes going north-west to Saint-Lyé. The D60 from Troyes to Dierrey-Saint-Pierre passes through the south-western end of the commune. The D619 comes from Sainte-Maure in the north-east and passes through the centre of the commune and the town and continues south-west to join the D60 in the commune. The airport runway crosses three-quarters of the commune west of the D619 from north to south with access to the airport terminal by the Route de l'Aerodrome branching off the D619. The main railway line from Troyes to the north-west passes through the commune with a station in the town. Apart from a large urban area covering most of the north-west of the commune and the airport occupying the centre, the rest of the commune is farmland.

The Seine river passes through the north-east of the commune as it flows north-west to eventually reach Paris and the Atlantic ocean at Le Havre. The former Canal de la Haute-Seine begins in the commune and follows the Seine to eventually join the Aube at Marcilly-sur-Seine.

Neighbouring communes and villages

Administration

List of Successive Mayors

Demography
In 2017 the commune had 1,449 inhabitants.

Culture and heritage

Civil heritage
The commune has a number of buildings and sites that are registered as historical monuments:
A Canal Bridge over the Seine (1847)
A Chateau (1626)
The Huot Mill (now a hydro-electric power station) (19th century) The Mill contains an Hydraulic Turbine (20th century) which is registered as an historical object.

Religious heritage

The Parish Church of Saint-Sulpice (12th century) is registered as an historical monument. has a Romanesque nave from the 12th century and a choir and transept from the 16th and 17th centuries. There is a wooden Renaissance tribune of twenty-five panels. The façade and porch are half-timbered. The Church contains a very large number of items that are registered as historical objects.

Notable people linked to the commune
Claude-Louis Bruslé de Valsuzenay (6 December 1766 Paris - 2 March 1825 Paris), French politician and senior official in the 18th and 19th centuries, Châtelain of Barberey.

See also
 Communes of the Aube department

References

External links
Barberey-Saint-Sulpice official website 

Communes of Aube